The siege of Aleppo lasted from 18 January to 24 January 1260.

After receiving the submission of Harran and Edessa, Mongol leader Hulagu Khan crossed the Euphrates, sacked Manbij and placed Aleppo under siege. He was supported by forces of Bohemond VI of Antioch and Hethum I of Armenia. For six days the city was under siege. Assisted by catapults and mangonels, Mongol, Armenian and Frankish forces overran the entire city, except for the citadel which held out until 25 February and was demolished following its capitulation. The ensuing massacre, that lasted six days, was methodical and thorough, in which nearly all Muslims and Jews were killed, though most of the women and children were sold into slavery. Also included in the destruction, was the burning of the Great Mosque of Aleppo.

Following the siege, Hulagu had some of Hethum's troops executed for burning the mosque, Some sources state Bohemond VI of Antioch (leader of the Franks) personally saw to the mosque's destruction. Later, Hulagu Khan returned castles and districts to Hethum which had been taken by the Ayyubids.

Ibrahim, the brother of Ibn Batish, was killed during the siege.

References

Bibliography
 
 
 
 
 
 

Aleppo 1260
Aleppo 1260
Aleppo
1260 in Asia
Aleppo 1260
History of Aleppo
Aleppo
1260 in the Mongol Empire